Itsik Pe'er is a computational biologist and a Full Professor in the Department of Computer Science at Columbia University.

Research and career

Pe'er has created computational tools for the analysis of high-throughput DNA sequence data. In particular, he has developed an approach to map copy number variation from whole exome sequencing data. He has published approaches to quantify hidden relatedness and infer population structure using DNA data. He has conducted studies on the genetics of complex traits in Ashkenazi Jews, historically a relatively isolated population enabling identification of genetic risk factors for common disorders in all populations. He is generating a comprehensive resource of genetic variants in the population for precision public health.

Selected publications 

 Estimation of the multiple testing burden for genomewide association studies of nearly all common variants. I Pe'er, R Yelensky, D Altshuler, MJ Daly Genetic Epidemiology. 32(4):381-5. doi:10.1002/gepi.20303
 Evaluating and improving power in whole-genome association studies using fixed marker sets. I Pe'er, PIW de Bakker, J Maller, R Yelensky, D Altshuler, MJ Daly Nature Genetics. 38(6):663-667. doi:10.1038/ng1816
 Sequencing an Ashkenazi reference panel supports population-targeted personal genomics and illuminates Jewish and European origins. Shai Carmi, Ken Y Hui, Ethan Kochav, Xinmin Liu, James Xue, Fillan Grady, Saurav Guha, Kinnari Upadhyay, Dan Ben-Avraham, Semanti Mukherjee, B Monica Bowen, Tinu Thomas, Joseph Vijai, Marc Cruts, Guy Froyen, Diether Lambrechts, Stéphane Plaisance, Christine Van Broeckhoven, Philip Van Damme, Herwig Van Marck, Nir Barzilai, Ariel Darvasi, Kenneth Offit, Susan Bressman, Laurie J Ozelius, Inga Peter, Judy H Cho, Harry Ostrer, Gil Atzmon, Lorraine N Clark, Todd Lencz, Itsik Pe’er. Nature Communications. doi:10.1038/ncomms5835

Personal life

Itsik Pe'er is married to Dana Pe'er, a computational biologist at Sloan Kettering Institute.

References

External links 

Faculty page, The Fu Foundation School of Engineering and Applied Science, Columbia University

Statistical_geneticists
Year of birth missing (living people)
Living people
Columbia University faculty
Tel Aviv University alumni
American bioinformaticians